Závada is a village and municipality in Humenné District in the Prešov Region of north-east Slovakia.

History
In historical records the village was first mentioned in 1454.

Geography
The municipality lies at an altitude of 230 metres and covers an area of 9.033 km².
It has a population of about 81 people.

References

External links
 
http://www.statistics.sk/mosmis/eng/run.html

Villages and municipalities in Humenné District
Zemplín (region)